St. Louis Church is a historic Roman Catholic church in Louisville, Ohio. The building was added to the National Register of Historic Places in 1979.

It was built in 1870–75 in a French Gothic/High Victorian Gothic style. It served a community of French Catholic immigrants who left eastern France in 1826 and settled here. A brick church was built by 1838, which was demolished in 1869 to make room for the present church which was completed in 1875. It was designed by parish priest Father Louis Hoffer reportedly after the design of a small village cathedral in France. Its interior was designed by Cleveland architect Frank Walsh.

References

Roman Catholic churches completed in 1875
Churches in the Roman Catholic Diocese of Youngstown
Churches on the National Register of Historic Places in Ohio
Gothic Revival church buildings in Ohio
Churches in Stark County, Ohio
National Register of Historic Places in Stark County, Ohio
19th-century Roman Catholic church buildings in the United States